The 37th Young Artist Awards ceremony, presented by the Young Artist Association, honored excellence of young performers between the ages of 5 to 18 in the fields of film, television, theatre and the internet for the 2015 calendar year. Winners were announced on March 13, 2016, at the annual ceremony and banquet luncheon held in the Empire Ballroom of the Sportsmen's Lodge in Studio City, California.

Winners and nominees
★ Winners were announced on March 13, 2016.

Best Performance in a Feature Film

Best Performance in a Short Film

Best Performance in a TV Movie, Miniseries, Special or Pilot

Best Performance in a TV Series

Best Performance in a TV Commercial

Outstanding Young Ensemble Cast in a TV Series

Outstanding Young Ensemble Cast in a Web or VOD Series

Best Performance in a Voice-Over Role

Best Performance in a Film for DVD

Best Web Performance

Best Performance in Live Theater

References

External links 

Young Artist Awards ceremonies
March 2016 events in the United States
2016 in California